Antônio Jácome de Lima Júnior (born 26 May 1962), better known as Antônio Jácome, is a Brazilian politician as well as a lawyer, medic, and theologian. Although born in Paraíba, he has spent his political career representing Rio Grande do Norte, having served as federal deputy representative from 2015 to 2019.

Personal life
Jácome is the son of Francisco Xavier de Mesquita and Alda Jácome de Mesquita. Aside from being a politician Jácome has also worked as a lawyer, medic, and theologian. His son Jacó Jácome and nephew Eriko Jácome are both politicians in the state legislature of Rio Grande do Norte. In August 2017 Jácome published a book detailing his time in office.

He is a member and former pastor of the Assembleias de Deus, and became the first evangelical elected from Rio Grande do Norte as federal deputy. In 2011 Jácome was expelled from the role of pastor in the church after it was exposed that Jácome had impregnated a woman in an extra marital affair and later forced her to have an abortion.

Political career
Jácome voted in favor of the impeachment of then-president Dilma Rousseff. Jácome voted in favor of 2015 tax reforms but against the 2017 Brazilian labor reform, and would vote in favor of a corruption investigation into Rousseff's successor Michel Temer.

Jácome contested the 2018 Brazilian general election in his state for the position of senator and garnered 307,399 votes, although it was not enough for him to be elected. In December 2018 Jácome was rumored for the position of Minister of Women, Family and Human Rights in the Bolsonaro government, a move that was controversial both with liberals and conservatives due to his anti-abortion views and his history of forcing a woman to have an abortion. Eventually Damares Alves was nominated instead.

References 

1962 births
Living people
People from Paraíba
Brazilian physicians
Brazilian Christian theologians
Brazilian Assemblies of God pastors
Podemos (Brazil) politicians
Party of National Mobilization politicians
Brazilian Socialist Party politicians
Democratic Labour Party (Brazil) politicians
Brazilian Democratic Movement politicians
Members of the Chamber of Deputies (Brazil) from Rio Grande do Norte
Members of the Legislative Assembly of Rio Grande do Norte